Dipak Sharma (Nepali: दिपक शर्मा ) is a Nepali music director and composer.  He has composed more than a thousand songs and has received several awards.

Career, Early Life & Biography
Composer Sharma was born on 1985.  He began composing in 2061 BS (2004-2005 AD). He has given melodies on above a thousand songs of modern, folk, pop and filmy songs.   He started his musical career composing folk-tune on a folk song ‘Dhalke Pipal’. Some of his publishes songs are  Malai Aafno banayara dukhi banchhau bhane, Jindakiko sawaal hunchha ,Adhikhola Urlier, Pirim Lagaune, Timra Dola Dola haatama, Timro  picture hit, Parkha parkha mayalu, Dekha na champa, and Maile laune Jhumke bulaki, performed by a child singer. He received a Tika gopal song award in 2079 BS.

He received his earliest music education from music teachers Narhari Premi from Shruti Sangeet Vidyalaya.Sharma is a Lifetime member of the Nepal Music Association in Kathmandu. This membership has been given on the occasion of World Music Day, Honors and awards program 2079 B.S. Sharma has contributed the of a dozen of Nepali films. Mangalam, Chakkapanja, Chakkapanja-3, Chakka Panja 4 Hijo Ajaka Kura, Hawaldar Suntali, Kismat-2, which are noted as commercially success films among all.. Sharma has been certified for his work as a music composer on the film Love You Baba, a Guinness World Record holder film. Sharma has played a decisive role(Jury Member) by being associated with various organizations, like Chaya Chhabi Teej Award 2078, Annapurna Global Festa, Spiny Babbler award,Genius Music Award 2079 and Nepal Music & fashion Award 2079.

Songs

Movie Song

General Song

Awards

Honors

References 

Nepalese songwriters
Music directors
1985 births
Living people